In the Kingdom was the fourth album by Christian metal band Whitecross. It reached No. 12 on Billboard's Top Contemporary Christian Albums chart.  The album won a Dove Award for Hard Music Album of the Year for 1991.

The video for the song "No Second Chances" was the band's first video ever seen on MTV's Headbangers Ball.

Track listing

Band members
 Scott Wenzel - vocals
 Rex Carroll - guitars
 Butch Dillon - bass
 Mike Feighan - drums, vocals

References

1991 albums
Whitecross albums